The sum of four cubes problem asks whether every integer is the sum of four cubes of integers.  It is conjectured the answer is affirmative, but this conjecture has been neither proved nor disproved. Some of the cubes may be negative numbers, in contrast to Waring's problem on sums of cubes, where they are required to be positive.

lead to the identity

which shows that every integer multiple of 6 is the sum of four cubes.  (More generally, the same proof shows that every multiple of 6 in every ring is the sum of four cubes.)

Since every integer is congruent to its own cube modulo 6, it follows that every rational integer is the sum of five cubes of integers.

In 1966, V. A. Demjanenko proved that any integer that is congruent neither to 4 nor to −4 modulo 9 is the sum of four cubes of integers. For this, he used the following identities:

and

These identities (and those derived from them by passing to opposites) immediately show that any integer which is congruent neither to 4 nor to −4 modulo 9 and is congruent neither to 2 nor to −2 modulo 18 is a sum of four cubes of rational integers. Using more subtle reasonings, Demjanenko proved that integers congruent to 2 or to −2 modulo 18 are also sums of four cubes of integers.

The problem therefore only arises for integers congruent to 4 or to −4 modulo 9.  One example is

but it is not known if every such integer can be written as a sum of four cubes.

See also 
 Sums of three cubes

Notes and references 

Diophantine equations
Unsolved problems in mathematics